Madhepura is one of the administrative divisions of Madhepura district in the Indian state of  Bihar. The block headquarters are located at a distance of 2 km from the district headquarters, namely, Madhepura.

Geography

Panchayats
Panchayats in Madhepura community development block are: Barahi, Sahugarh 1, ganeshsthan, Sahugarh 2, Mathahi, Balam Gadhiya, Khopaiti Tuniahi, Sukhasan, Madanpur, Madhuban, Manikpur, Tulsibari rajpur malia, Sakarpura Betona, Mahesua, Dhurgawn, Bhadaul Budhma, Murho, Manpur and Bhelwa.

Demographics
In the 2001 census Madhepura Block had a population of 194,620.

See also
 Madhepura

References

Community development blocks in Madhepura district